W13DQ-D, VHF digital channel 13 (virtual channel 45), is a low-powered HSN-affiliated television station licensed to Atlanta, Georgia, United States.

History
Founded in 1987 on channel 24, the station is owned by Ventana Television, the subsidiary of HSN which is the holding company for its broadcast licenses. In March 2007, the station changed channels and therefore callsigns from W24AL to W23DN, on channel 23+. The station owner applied to the FCC to move to channel 6 for its migration to DTV broadcasting. This digital companion channel, which was given a construction permit in January 2007, had callsign W06CM-D.

After being extended by six months in January 2010, the permit expired in mid July, however the FCC approved a "flash cut" to digital on channel 24, which was applied-for in January. By moving back to its former channel, it would have reclaimed its old callsign (but with the digital suffix) as W24AL-D. The move was made possible by WGXA (channel 24) in Macon (the central Georgia TV market) using channel 16 after the analog shutdown, eliminating the co-channel interference the two stations previously had at times. In late October 2010, it instead applied for channel 45 (vacated by WYGA-CA) at the same location and height, with somewhat higher power and slightly different antenna rotation.

The previous analog and current digital station are on the same broadcast tower, located along Briarcliff Road near the North Druid Hills area immediately northeast of Atlanta, with several other FM and TV stations. The expired digital permit for W06CM was for the WUPA (channel 69) tower near Reynoldstown in Atlanta, east-southeast of downtown along Interstate 20.  (see list of Atlanta broadcast stations by location#Reynoldstown).

The digital station went on the air in February 2012 on channel 45, leaving WUVM-LP (channel 4) as the only analog TV station broadcasting in the metro area.

The station went off the air on July 13, 2020, to make way for new wireless services. It held a construction permit to move to channel 13 as W13DQ-D, and was licensed for this service effective August 5, 2022.

External links
HSN official site

Television stations in Georgia (U.S. state)
Television channels and stations established in 1989
1989 establishments in Georgia (U.S. state)
Low-power television stations in the United States